Saahibaa is a 2000 Maldivian romantic drama film directed by Arifa Ibrahim. Produced by Aslam Rasheed under Slam Studio, the film stars Yoosuf Shafeeu, Mariyam Nazima and Fathimath Sharumeela in pivotal roles.

Premise
Shahudhu (Yoosuf Shafeeu) desperately searches for options to earn money which is needed for his wife, Fiyaza's (Mariyam Nazima) heart surgery. There, he meets a wealthy businessman, Fahumee (Ali Shameel) who agrees to lend him MVR 2,000,000 on one condition; marry his only child, an 18 years old stubborn young woman, Meena (Fathimath Sharumeela). The couple marry and follows a master-slave relationship as instructed by Fahumee. One night, Shahudhu saves Meena from being gang-raped, which results in Meena realizing his honesty and becomes romantically attached to him. However, Meena is heartbroken when she realizes that Shahudhu is deeply in love with his wife, Fiyaza. Meanwhile, Fiyaza reluctantly continues an affair with a divorcee, Waseem (Mohamed Afrah).

Cast 
 Yoosuf Shafeeu as Shahudhu
 Mariyam Nazima as Aminath Fiyaza
 Fathimath Sharumeela as Meena
 Ali Shameel as Fahumee
 Waleedha Waleed as Mariyam
 Mohamed Afrah as Waseem
 Yoosuf Naeem
 Mohamed Anil
 Neena Saleem as Mariyam's friend (Special appearance)
 Hassan Shafeeu
 Mariyam Azza 
 Mohamed Thoha
 Ahid Ahmed
 Ibrahim Rasheed

Soundtrack

References

Maldivian romantic drama films
2000 films
Films directed by Arifa Ibrahim